Murdoch Paterson (September 1826 – 9 August 1898) was an engineer and architect based in Inverness, Scotland, who was chief engineer of the Highland Railway.

Background
He was born in September 1826, one of five sons of Donald Paterson (1778-1851), farmer, at Dell of Inshes, Inverness, and Elizabeth Munro(1789–1847).

He was educated at Inverness Royal Academy, and initially worked as a wine merchant in Inverness.

His elder brother, William Paterson, was also an engineer.

Career
In 1846, he became articled to Joseph Mitchell, the Inspector of Highland Roads and Bridges, and surveyor of railways in the Highlands. In 1851 he worked on expanding the Port of Inverness, and from 1854 worked with Joseph Mitchell on the construction of new lines for the Highland Railway, including Inverness to Keith.

In 1862, Joseph Mitchell set up a partnership with William and Murdoch Paterson, as Joseph Mitchell and Company. Mitchell retired in 1867, and Murdoch became chief engineer of the Highland Railway on 6 November 1874.

As well as engineering the construction of new lines for the Highland Railway, he also prepared the designs of many new stations.

He died on 9 August 1898 whilst still in post, just three months before the opening of the new line from Inverness to Aviemore. His estate was valued at £10,611.

Wives and children

He married Jane MacCallum (1826 - 1868) in January 1852. They had two children:
Elizabeth Paterson (1853 - 1933) 
Donald Paterson (1854 - 1885).

He married Frances Wiles (1837 - 1906)  in London in 1870 and they also had two children:
Violet Mary J Paterson (b. 1875)
Murdoch William Paterson (1877 - 1880).

Main works

Gallery

References

19th-century Scottish architects
Scottish civil engineers
Highland Railway
People educated at Inverness Royal Academy
1826 births
1898 deaths
British railway architects